This article displays the women qualifying draw of the 2011 Mutua Madrid Open.

Players

Seeds

Qualifiers

Qualifying draw

First qualifier

Second qualifier

Third qualifier

Fourth qualifier

Fifth qualifier

Sixth qualifier

Seventh qualifier

Eighth qualifier

References
 Qualifying Draw

Women's Singles Qualifying
Qualification for tennis tournaments